The following is a list of notable magazines in Pakistan.

In English 

 Fashion Central, (Published in Lahore)
 Herald, (News magazine, published in Karachi, owned by Dawn Group of Newspapers, suspended its publication after July 2019)
 Mobile World, (Monthly magazine on Automobile, motorcycle & transport, published in Karachi)
 Newsline, (Monthly current affairs magazine, published in Karachi)
 Pakistan & Gulf Economist, (Weekly magazine on business and economy, published in Karachi)
 Pakistan Textile Journal, (Monthly textile magazine, published in Karachi)
 Shaheen Annual Youth Magazine, (In languages English, Urdu, Saraiki & Pashto, published in Allama Iqbal Medical College, Lahore)
 Spider, (Monthly computer magazine, published in Karachi, owned by the Dawn group)
 Trade Chronicle, (monthly commerce magazine)

In Urdu 

 Akhbar e Jahan, Karachi
 Global Science, Karachi
 The Cricketer, Karachi
 Family Magazine, Lahore
 Jadeed Adab, literary magazine, Khanpur and Germany
 Monthly Mirrat-ul-Arifeen International, Urdu research magazine
 Nida e Millat, Lahore
 Nigar, Karachi

Digests 

 Dosheeza Digest, Karachi
 Kiran Digest, Karachi
 Suspense Digest, Karachi
 Urdu Digest, Lahore
 Sabrang Digest, Karachi
 Hikayat Digest, Lahore

Health journals
 Hamdard-e-Sehat, Karachi

Children's magazines 

 Hamdard Naunehal, Karachi
 Monthly Sathee, Karachi
 Anokhi Kahaniyan, Karachi
 Monthly Phool, Lahore
 Taleem-o-Tarbiat, Lahore

In Sindhi 

 Mehran Magazine, Karachi
 Waskaro, Karachi
 Laat, Karachi
 Gul Phul, Karachi

In Punjabi 

 Lehran, Lahore

Children's magazines 

 Monthly Pukheroo, Lahore

References

Magazines

Pakistan